Bishop Adna Wright Leonard I (November 2, 1874 – May 3, 1943) was a Methodist bishop in Buffalo, New York, and the first chairman of the Methodist Commission on Chaplains. He was killed in 1943 in a plane crash on his way to Iceland to visit Methodist chaplains and their troops.

Biography
He was born in Cincinnati, Ohio, on November 2, 1874, to Adna Bradway Leonard (1837–1916) and Caroline (Kaiser) Leonard (1840–1899). He was elected bishop in 1916.

He married Mary Luella Day (1873–1956) on October 9, 1901, and had the following children: Adna Wright Leonard II (1904–1986); and Phyllis Day (Leonard) Budd (1907–2002).

He was elected to the episcopacy of the Methodist Episcopal Church at the 1916 General Conference.  He served in San Francisco, Pittsburgh and Washington, D.C.

He was killed on May 3, 1943, in a plane crash on his way to Iceland to visit Methodist chaplains and their troops.
Thirteen other people were killed in the plane crash, including Lieutenant General Frank Maxwell Andrews.

Career
President of the New York Anti-Saloon League 
Chairman The Methodist Commission on Chaplains
Headed trustees of the University of Southern California

See also
List of bishops of the United Methodist Church

References

1874 births
1943 deaths
Bishops of the Methodist Episcopal Church
Methodists from New York (state)
American chaplains
American temperance activists
American civilians killed in World War II
Burials in Iceland
American sermon writers
20th-century Methodist bishops
Medal for Merit recipients
Activists from New York (state)
Victims of aviation accidents or incidents in Iceland
Victims of aviation accidents or incidents in 1943
Writers from New York (state)